The 2016–17 season is Grimsby Town's 139th season of existence and their first back in League Two after gaining promotion the previous season. Along with competing in League Two, the club will also participate in the FA Cup, League Cup and Football League Trophy.

The season covers the period from 1 July 2016 to 30 June 2017.

Transfers

In

Out

Loans in

Loans out

Competitions

Pre-season friendlies

League Two

League table

Matches

FA Cup

EFL Cup

EFL Trophy

References

Grimsby Town
Grimsby Town F.C. seasons